The Aurland United Norwegian Lutheran Church is a church located southeast of Frederick, South Dakota, built in 1903–1905. It is no longer actively used for services. The church has not been altered significantly since its construction.  In 1982, it was listed in the National Register of Historic Places.

The congregation was organized in 1885.  The church was patterned after the home church of immigrants from Aurland, Sogn, Norway.

References

Lutheran churches in South Dakota
Norwegian-American culture in South Dakota
Churches on the National Register of Historic Places in South Dakota
Churches completed in 1905
Churches in Brown County, South Dakota
National Register of Historic Places in Brown County, South Dakota
1885 establishments in Dakota Territory